#Iamhere is a 2019 comedy drama film. The film stars Alain Chabat, Bae Doona, Blanche Gardin, Ilian Bergala, Jules Sagot, Camille Rutherford and Delphine Gleize.

Cast
 Alain Chabat as Stéphane Lucas
 Bae Doona as Soo
 Blanche Gardin as Suzanne
 Ilian Bergala as David Lucas
 Jules Sagot as Ludo Lucas
 Camille Rutherford as Jane
 Delphine Gleize as Catherine
 Lazare Lartigau as Hugo
 Lee Myeong-ja as old lady
 Kim Ja-guem as waitress
 Kang Hyeon-joong as chef
 Myteen as themselves

Release
It premiered at the 2019 Busan International Film Festival.

References

External links
 

2019 comedy-drama films
2010s French-language films
2010s Korean-language films
French comedy-drama films
Belgian comedy-drama films
Films about chefs
Films about travel
Films set in airports
Films set in restaurants
Films set in France
Films set in Incheon
Films set in Seoul
Films shot in France
Films shot in Incheon
Films shot in Seoul
Films with screenplays by Thomas Bidegain
Gaumont Film Company films
2019 multilingual films
French multilingual films
Belgian multilingual films
2010s French films